Ursprung Pass (836 m) is a mountain pass in the Alps, located on the border between Austria and Germany between the Bundesländer of Tyrol and Bavaria. It is 11.5 km west of Kufstein (Tyrol) and connects the Ursprung valley in the north in Bavaria with the Thiersee valley in Tyrol in the south. The pass road has a maximum grade of 13% and can be driven by vehicles towing trailers.

See also
 List of highest paved roads in Europe
 List of mountain passes

Mountain passes of Tyrol (state)
Mountain passes of Bavaria
Mountain passes of the Alps
Austria–Germany border crossings